Popovka is a rural locality (a khutor) in Sestrenskoye Rural Settlement, Kamyshinsky District, Volgograd Oblast, Russia. The population was 125 as of 2010. There are 13 streets.

Geography 
Popovka is located in steppe, on the Volga Upland, on the Panfetyeva River, 13 km southwest of Kamyshin (the district's administrative centre) by road. Vikhlyantsevo is the nearest rural locality.

References 

Rural localities in Kamyshinsky District